Sylhet Cantonment Public School and College is an educational institute in Sylhet, Bangladesh.

History 
Established on 1 January 2019, the institution is regulated by the Bangladesh Army and approved by the Board of Intermediate and Secondary Education, Sylhet. It offers higher secondary subjects including science, commerce and arts programmes.
The principal is usually a lieutenant colonel of 
the Bangladesh Army.

The prolocutor of the Governing Body is the station commander of Sylhet Cantonment. The prolocutor is a brigadier general of the Bangladesh Army.

School with primary
The school section gives the opportunity of studying from class 1 to 10. Students of class 9 & 10 can study science, business studies and arts programmes. In classes 6–10, an English version is available as well as Bangla.

College
The college section started in 2019, initially with science, business studies and arts program. The college uses different modern ways and multimedia to conduct their classes .

Academics
Departments
 Science
 Commerce
 Arts

See also 
 Adamjee Cantonment Public School & College
 Rangpur Cantonment Public College
 Chittagong Public School & College
 Dawood Public School

References

External links
 Official website
 https://web.archive.org/web/20080912231128/http://www.bise-sylhet.gov.bd/
 1st Anniversary

High schools in Bangladesh
Educational institutions established in 2019
Education in Sylhet
2019 establishments in Bangladesh
Educational Institutions affiliated with Bangladesh Army